Eulimella pelluscens is a species of sea snail, a marine gastropod mollusk in the family Eulimidae. The species is one of a number within the genus Eulimella.

References

 Higo, S., Callomon, P. & Goto, Y. (1999) Catalogue and Bibliography of the Marine Shell-Bearing Mollusca of Japan. Elle Scientific Publications, Yao, Japan, 749 pp.

External links
 To World Register of Marine Species

pellucens
Gastropods described in 1861